HBK Investments (HBK Capital Management) is a global, multi-strategy alternative investment management firm based in Dallas, Texas. As of 2015, it manages approximately $9.7 billion and employs 200 individuals. In addition to the main offices in Dallas, the firm maintains satellite offices in New York, Virginia, London, Tokyo, and Hong Kong. Since inception in 1991, HBK's funds have delivered annualized returns of approximately 11.6%, net of fees.

The firm takes its name from the initials of Harlan B. Korenvaes, former Managing Director of Merrill Lynch in charge of the firm's convertible arbitrage trading and sales. He left Merrill Lynch and founded HBK in October 1991, starting with $30 million in capital from four limited partners, including Richard Rainwater, David Geffen, the Ziff family, and the Burden family, heirs to the Vanderbilt fortune. Korenvaes retired from HBK in 2003 to run his family office, Korenvaes Capital.

In mid-2007 HBK's assets peaked at $14.06 billion, making it one of the largest hedge funds in the world, though it subsequently suffered heavy redemptions during and following the global financial crisis.

In 2015, Institutional Investor/Alpha magazine gave HBK an A grade and the #13 ranking among hedge funds worldwide.

References

External links
Home page
NASDAQ profile

Hedge funds
Hedge fund firms in Texas
Companies based in Dallas
Investment management companies of the United States